The 8th Canadian Infantry Brigade was an infantry brigade of the Canadian Army that saw active service during World War I and World War II as part of the 3rd Canadian Infantry Division. The brigade fought on the Western Front during World War I from December 1915 to November 1918, and in Normandy and north-west Europe in 1944–1945 during World War II. It was a square formation of four infantry battalions during World War I, but was reduced to a triangular formation of three battalions during World War II.

History

World War I
Raised in December 1915 in France, the 8th Brigade formed part of the 3rd Canadian Division, and was formed from six Mounted Rifles regiments that were converted into infantry units, forming four infantry battalions. The brigade's first major action was fought around Mount Sorrel, where the brigade's commander, Brigadier General Victor Williams, was captured. After this, the brigade took part in most of the major actions fought by the Canadians on the Western Front for the next two-and-a-half years until the armistice in November 1918.

World War II
Formed once again as part of the 3rd Canadian Division, the 8th Brigade headquarters formed in September 1940, consisting of three infantry battalions supported by an anti-tank company. Training was conducted in Canada, and by July 1941, the brigade departed for the United Kingdom. After training in Britain, the 8th Brigade formed part of the assault forces on D-Day, at Juno Beach. The 8th went ashore in the area Courseulles-sur-Mer, Bernières-sur-Mer and St Aubin-sur-Mer, its task was to clear the beach and establish a beachhead perimeter before moving inland. Clearance of Courseilles was quickly done, thanks to detailed planning. Although the 8th Brigade reached is objectives by D-Day evening, "mopping-up" of by-passed German strongpoints took another ten days.

Structure

World War I
During World War I, the 8th Brigade consisted of the following units:
1st Battalion, Canadian Mounted Rifles, CEF: December 1915 – 11 November 1918
2nd Battalion, Canadian Mounted Rifles, CEF: December 1915 – 11 November 1918
4th Battalion, Canadian Mounted Rifles, CEF: December 1915 – 11 November 1918
5th Battalion, Canadian Mounted Rifles, CEF: December 1915 – 11 November 1918

In addition, the brigade was supported by a machine gun company and a trench mortar battery.

World War II
During World War II, the 8th Brigade consisted of the following units:

1st Battalion, The Queen's Own Rifles of Canada
1st Battalion, Le Régiment de la Chaudière
1st Battalion, The North Shore (New Brunswick) Regiment
8th Infantry Brigade Ground Defence Platoon (Lorne Scots)

References

Canadian World War II brigades
Infantry brigades of the Canadian Army
Canadian World War I brigades
Military units and formations disestablished in the 1940s